Andy Bronkema (born February 23, 1984) is the men's head basketball coach for the Ferris State Bulldogs.

Early life and education
Bronkema is the son of Joel Bronkema, the principal of McBain High School. Andy grew up in McBain, Michigan, and his younger brother Luke is also a college basketball coach. Bronkema was a multi-sport standout at McBain High School, competing in football, basketball and baseball. He led the Ramblers to a state basketball title in 2002 in addition to a state football runner-up effort in 2001. Bronkema attended Cornerstone University, where he played on the basketball team. He led Cornerstone to two regular-season Wolverine Hoosier Athletic Conference (WHAC) Championships, one WHAC Tournament title and four national tournament appearances, including a NAIA Final Four berth. Bronkema was named team captain as a junior and senior and was a three-time named All-Conference selection. He earned the Basketball Coaches Association of Michigan Scholar-Athlete Award and finished his collegiate career with 1,725 points, 982 rebounds, 336 assists and 140 steals. Bronkema graduated from Cornerstone with a bachelor's degree in Education.

Coaching career
Bronkema began his career as the head running backs coach at Grand Rapids Community College in 2005 and helped the team finish as the National Junior College Athletic Association (NJCAA) Non-Scholarship National Champions. In 2007, he became an assistant coach under Bill Sall at Ferris State University while also teaching elementary physical education at Crossroads Charter Academy. Bronkema was responsible for recruiting Division II Player of the Year Justin Keenan to Ferris State. In 2010, Bronkema was named Ferris State's top assistant, and he helped the Bulldogs win the GLIAC North Division Championship and reached the NCAA Division II Sweet Sixteen. In the 2011–12 season, he led Ferris State to a share of a second-straight GLIAC North Division championship. Bronkema led a camp and spotted Zach Hankins at it, offering Hankins his only scholarship offer.

In May 2013, Bronkema was named interim head coach after Sall accepted the job at Northern Michigan University. Bronkema was named head coach on June 28. He was offered the head job after the top two candidates turned it down. In his first season, Ferris State finished 10–16. The Bulldogs improved under his direction, as they finished the 2015–16 season with a 24–10 overall record and an appearance in the NCAA Division II Sweet 16. The following year, Ferris State went 28–5, won the GLIAC regular season and tournament titles, and reached the Division II second round. 

In the 2017–18 season, he led Ferris State to a 38–1 record, including 19–1 in the GLIAC. The Bulldogs captured their first-ever Division II title by defeating Northern State in the championship game 71–69, and Hankins was named Most Outstanding Player. Bronkema was named 2018 National Coach of the Year by the NABC. Despite losing point guard Jaylin McFadden early in the season to a torn ACL, the 2019–20 team finished 27–6.

Personal life
Bronkema married his wife, Jenae, in 2007 after graduating from college. They live in Big Rapids, Michigan with their daughters Elliana, Cambria, and Seneca. He is a Christian. In addition to coaching at Ferris State, he is an adjunct professor in the College of Education and Human Services.

Head coaching record

References

External links
Ferris State profile

1984 births
Living people
American men's basketball coaches
American men's basketball players
Basketball coaches from Michigan
Basketball players from Michigan
College men's basketball head coaches in the United States
College men's basketball players in the United States
Cornerstone University alumni
Ferris State Bulldogs men's basketball coaches
Junior college football coaches in the United States